Kembu Maru was a 953-ton transport ship of Imperial Japanese Army during World War II.

She left Rabaul, New Britain on 1 March 1943, as part of Operation 81, carrying a cargo of 1,000 drums of avgas and 650 drums of other fuel for Lae, New Guinea.

The convoy was attacked by aircraft of the United States Army Air Forces and Royal Australian Air Force from 2 March 1943, known as the Battle of the Bismarck Sea. Kembu Maru was bombed on 3 March; she exploded in a giant fireball and sank at 07°15'S., 148°30'E. 20 troops were killed in action.

Notes

References

Maritime incidents in March 1943
Ships sunk by Australian aircraft
World War II auxiliary ships of Japan
Ships sunk by US aircraft
Shipwrecks in the Bismarck Sea